Orsa (F 567) is the fourth ship of the Lupo-class frigate of the Italian Navy. She was sold to Peruvian Navy in the 2000s.

Aguirre (FM-55) is one of eight Carvajal-class frigates of the Peruvian Navy.

Construction and career

Italian service

The ship initially built for the Italian Navy and was named Perseo with a pennant of F 566. The ship was laid down on 1 August 1977, was launched on 1 March 1979 by the shipyard Riva Trigoso and commissioned in the Italian Navy on 1 March 1980.

Peruvian service

She was commissioned on 3 November 2004 . For its commissioning process, Coronel Bolognesi sailed from the port of La Spezia in the Mediterranean Sea, across the Atlantic Ocean and into the Pacific Ocean via the Panama Canal, and south to its base in Callao.

References

External links
 Orsa (F 567) Marina Militare website

Carvajal-class frigates
1979 ships
Ships built in Italy
Frigates of the Cold War